Antonio Sanz Cabello (born in Jerez de la Frontera, Spain in 1968) is a lawyer and politician. 

Licensed in law by the Colegio Provincial de Abogados de Cádiz, Sanz is currently General Secretary of the People's Party of Andalusia since July 2006, regional deputy of the Andalusian Parliament since March 2004 and a member of the National Board of Directors of the People's Party since 1996.

External links
 Partido Popular official site
People's Party of Spain in the United States official site
 Partido Popular en EEUU official site

1968 births
Living people
People from Jerez de la Frontera
People's Party (Spain) politicians
Members of the Parliament of Andalusia